A laser weapon is a directed-energy weapon based on lasers. After decades of R&D,  directed-energy weapons including lasers are still at the experimental stage and it remains to be seen if or when they will be deployed as practical, high-performance military weapons. Atmospheric thermal blooming has been a major problem, still mostly unsolved, and worsened if fog, smoke, dust, rain, snow, smog, foam, or purposely dispersed obscurant chemicals are present. Essentially, a laser generates a beam of light which needs clear air, or a vacuum, to work without thermal blooming.

Many types of laser can potentially be used as incapacitating weapons, through their ability to produce temporary or permanent vision loss when aimed at the eyes. The degree, character, and duration of vision impairment caused by eye exposure to laser light varies with the power of the laser, the wavelength(s), the collimation of the beam, the exact orientation of the beam, and the duration of exposure. Lasers of even a fraction of a watt in power can produce immediate, permanent vision loss under certain conditions, making such lasers potential non-lethal but incapacitating weapons. The extreme handicap that laser-induced blindness represents makes the use of lasers even as non-lethal weapons morally controversial, and weapons designed to cause permanent blindness have been banned by the Protocol on Blinding Laser Weapons.

Weapons designed to cause temporary blindness, known as dazzlers, are used by military and sometimes law enforcement organizations. Incidents of pilots being exposed to lasers while flying have prompted aviation authorities to implement special procedures to deal with such hazards. Laser weapons capable of directly damaging or destroying a target in combat are still in the experimental stage. The general idea of laser-beam weaponry is to hit a target with a train of brief pulses of light. The power needed to project a high-powered laser beam of this kind is beyond the limit of current mobile power technology, thus favoring chemically powered gas dynamic lasers. Example experimental systems included MIRACL and the Tactical High Energy Laser, which are now discontinued. The United States Navy has tested the very short range (1 mile), 30-kW Laser Weapon System or LaWS to be used against targets like small UAVs, rocket-propelled grenades, and visible motorboat or helicopter engines. It has been defined as "six welding lasers strapped together." A 60 kW system, HELIOS, is being developed for destroyer class ships .

Overview
Laser-based directed-energy weapons are being developed, such as Boeing's Airborne Laser, which was constructed inside a Boeing 747. Designated the YAL-1, it was intended to kill short- and intermediate-range ballistic missiles in their boost phase.

Another example of direct use of a laser as a defensive weapon was researched for the Strategic Defense Initiative (SDI, nicknamed "Star Wars"), and its successor programs. This project would use ground-based or space-based laser systems to destroy incoming intercontinental ballistic missiles (ICBMs). The practical problems of using and aiming these systems were many; particularly the problem of destroying ICBMs at the most opportune moment, the boost phase just after launch. This would involve directing a laser over a large distance through the atmosphere, which, due to optical scattering and refraction, would bend and distort the laser beam, complicating aim and reducing efficiency.

Another idea from the SDI project was the nuclear-pumped X-ray laser. This was essentially an orbiting atomic bomb, surrounded by laser media in the form of glass rods; when the bomb exploded, the rods would be bombarded with highly-energetic gamma-ray photons, causing spontaneous and stimulated emission of X-ray photons in the atoms making up the rods. This would lead to optical amplification of the X-ray photons, producing an X-ray laser beam that would be minimally affected by atmospheric distortion and capable of destroying ICBMs in flight. The X-ray laser would be a strictly one-shot device, destroying itself on activation. Some initial tests of this concept were performed with underground nuclear testing; however, the results were not encouraging. Research into this approach to missile defense was discontinued after the SDI program was canceled.

Electrolaser 

An electrolaser first ionizes its target path, and then sends an electric current down the conducting track of ionized plasma, somewhat like lightning. It functions as a giant, high-energy, long-distance version of the Taser or stun gun.

Pulsed energy projectile 

Pulsed Energy Projectile or PEP systems emit an infrared laser pulse which creates rapidly expanding plasma at the target. The resulting sound, shock and electromagnetic waves stun the target and cause pain and temporary paralysis. The weapon is under development and is intended as a non-lethal weapon in crowd control though it can also be used as a lethal weapon.

Dazzler 

A dazzler is a directed-energy weapon intended to temporarily blind or disorient its target with intense directed radiation. Targets can include sensors or human vision. Dazzlers emit infrared or invisible light against various electronic sensors, and visible light against humans, when they are intended to cause no long-term damage to eyes. The emitters are usually lasers, making what is termed a laser dazzler. Most of the contemporary systems are man-portable, and operate in either the red (a laser diode) or green (a diode-pumped solid-state laser, DPSS) areas of the electromagnetic spectrum.

Initially developed for military use, non-military products are becoming available for use in law enforcement and security.

The personnel halting and stimulation response rifle (PHASR) is a prototype non-lethal laser dazzler developed by the Air Force Research Laboratory's Directed Energy Directorate, U.S. Department of Defense. Its purpose is to temporarily disorient and blind a target. Blinding laser weapons have been tested in the past, but were banned under the 1995 United Nations Protocol on Blinding Laser Weapons, which the United States acceded to on 21 January 2009. The PHASR rifle, a low-intensity laser, is not prohibited under this regulation, as the blinding effect is intended to be temporary.  It also uses a two-wavelength laser. The PHASR was tested at Kirtland Air Force Base, part of the Air Force Research Laboratory Directed Energy Directorate in New Mexico.
 ZM-87
 PY132A is a Chinese anti-drone dazzler.
 Soviet laser pistol was a prototype weapon designed for cosmonauts.
 Optical Dazzling Interdictor, Navy (ODIN) is a U.S. laser to be field tested in 2019 on an  Arleigh Burke-class destroyer.

Examples 

Leading Western companies in the development of laser weapons have been Boeing, Northrop Grumman, Lockheed Martin, Netherlands Organisation for Applied Scientific Research, Rheinmetall and MBDA.

List:
 Project Excalibur was a United States government nuclear weapons research program to develop a nuclear pumped x-ray laser as a directed energy weapon for ballistic missile defense. Canceled.
 In 1984, the Soviet Strategic Missile Troops military academy developed the first handheld laser weapon, intended for use by cosmonauts in outer space. No longer used.
 1K17 Szhatie: An experimental Soviet self-propelled laser weapon. Never went beyond the experimental stage.
 In 1987, a Soviet laser-armed orbital weapon, the 17F19DM Polyus/Skif-DM, failed during deployment.
 The Soviet Terra-3 laser facility was widely thought to be a powerful anti-satellite weapon prototype, but after the Cold War ended it was found to be a testing site with limited satellite tracking capabilities. The site was abandoned and is now partially disassembled.
 In 1991, scientists at the US Army Missile Command developed and field tested a ruggedized tunable laser emitting narrow-linewidth in the yellow-orange-red part of the spectrum. Never went beyond the experimental stage.

 Throughout the 2000s, the United States Air Force worked on the Boeing YAL-1, or ATL, an airborne  gas laser or COIL chemical laser  mounted in a modified Boeing 747. It was intended to be used to shoot down incoming ballistic missiles over enemy territory. In March 2009, Northrop Grumman claimed that its engineers in Redondo Beach had successfully built and tested an electrically powered solid state laser capable of producing a 100-kilowatt beam, powerful enough to destroy an airplane. According to Brian Strickland, manager for the United States Army's Joint High Power Solid State Laser program, an electrically powered laser is capable of being mounted in an aircraft, ship, or other vehicle because it requires much less space for its supporting equipment than a chemical laser. However, the source of such a large electrical power in a mobile application remained unclear. Ultimately, the project was deemed to be infeasible, and was canceled in December 2011, with the Boeing YAL-1 prototype being stored and eventually dismantled.
 Precision Airborne Standoff Directed Energy Weapon (2008). Canceled.
 On 19 July 2010, an anti-aircraft laser described as the Laser Close-In Weapon System was unveiled at the Farnborough Airshow. Experimental.
 The ZEUS-HLONS (HMMWV Laser Ordnance Neutralization System) is the first laser and the first energy weapon of any type to be used on a battlefield. It is used for neutralizing mines and unexploded ordnance. Niche application.
 High Energy Liquid Laser Area Defense System (HELLADS). Status unknown.
 The Mid-Infrared Advanced Chemical Laser (MIRACL) was an experimental U.S. Navy deuterium fluoride laser and was tested against an Air Force satellite in 1997. Canceled.
 In 2011, the U.S. Navy began to test the Maritime Laser Demonstrator (MLD), a laser for use aboard its warships. Status unknown.
 Personnel Halting and Stimulation Response, or PHaSR, is a non-lethal hand-held weapon developed by the United States Air Force Its purpose is to "dazzle" or stun a target. It was developed by Air Force's Directed Energy Directorate. Status unknown.
 Tactical High Energy Laser (THEL) was a weaponized deuterium fluoride laser developed in a joint research project by Israel and the U.S. It was designed to shoot down aircraft and missiles. See also National missile defense. Discontinued in 2005 as a result of "its bulkiness, high costs and poor anticipated results on the battlefield", which are characteristic problems of all medium- and high-energy laser weapons.

 Soviet/Russian Beriev A-60: a CO2 gas laser mounted on an Ilyushin Il-76MD transport. Experimental.
 High Energy Laser-Mobile Demonstrator (HEL-MD) is a Boeing designed laser system mounted on a Heavy Expanded Mobility Tactical Truck (HEMTT). Its current power level is 10 kW, which will be boosted to 50 kW, and expected to eventually be upgraded to 100 kW. Targets that can be engaged are mortar rounds, artillery shells and rockets, unmanned aerial vehicles, and cruise missiles. Status unknown.
 In 2014 Lockheed Martin was developing a 60 kW fiber laser to mount on the HEMTT that maintains beam quality at high power outputs while using less electricity than solid-state lasers. Status unknown.
 Free-electron laser (FEL) technology is being evaluated by the US Navy as a candidate for an antiaircraft and anti-missile directed-energy weapon. The Thomas Jefferson National Accelerator Facility's FEL has demonstrated over 14 kW power output. Compact multi-megawatt class FEL weapons are undergoing research. On 9 June 2009 the Office of Naval Research announced it had awarded Raytheon a contract to develop a 100 kW experimental FEL. On 18 March 2010 Boeing Directed Energy Systems announced the completion of an initial design for U.S. Naval use. A prototype FEL system was demonstrated, with a full-power prototype scheduled by 2018. Experimental.
 Portable Efficient Laser Testbed (PELT) Status unknown.
 Laser AirCraft CounterMeasures (ACCM) Status unknown.
 Mobile Expeditionary High-Energy Laser (MEHEL) 2.0 Experimental.
 Area Defense Anti-Munitions (ADAM) Experimental.
 Advanced Test High Energy Asset (ATHENA) Status unknown.
 Self-Protect High-Energy Laser Demonstrator (SHiELD). Pre-prototype stage.
 Silent Hunter (laser weapon) is a Chinese fiber-optic laser air-defense system. A 2017 article describes a Chinese directed-energy weapon called Silent Hunter that can burn through two 5-millimeter steel plates from a range of 1000 meters. Status unknown.
 Russian Sokol Eshelon. Experimental.
 Russian Peresvet. Mobile air-defense laser, undergoing service testing as close-range mobile ICBM escorts.
 Raytheon Company announced that it developed a high-energy laser that can be mounted on a MRZR and used to disable an unmanned aerial system from approximately 1 mile away. Status unknown.
 ZKZM-500. Short-range antipersonnel less-lethal weapon.
 Made by Northrop Grumman:
On 18 March 2009, Northrop Grumman announced that its engineers in Redondo Beach had successfully built and tested an electric laser capable of producing a 100-kilowatt ray of light, powerful enough to destroy cruise missiles, artillery, rockets and mortar rounds.  An electric laser is theoretically capable, according to Brian Strickland, manager for the United States Army's Joint High Power Solid State Laser program, of being mounted in an aircraft, ship, or vehicle because it requires much less space for its supporting equipment than a chemical laser. Experimental.
On 6 April 2011, the U.S. Navy successfully tested a laser gun, manufactured by Northrop Grumman, that was mounted on the former , which is currently used as the navy's test ship.  When engaged during the test that occurred off the coast of Central California in the Pacific Ocean test range, the laser gun was documented as having "a destructive effect on a high-speed cruising target", said Chief of Naval Research Admiral Nevin Carr. Experimental.
 Skyguard (area defense system). Proposed.
 On 19 July 2010, an anti-aircraft laser described as the Laser Close-In Weapon System was unveiled at the Farnborough Airshow.
 Area Defense Anti-Munitions (ADAM) Lockheed Martin experimental fiber laser. 10 kilowatt tested against rockets.
 In 2011, the U.S. Navy began to test the Maritime Laser Demonstrator (MLD), a laser for use aboard its warships. By 2013, the Navy was announcing active deployment in 2014.
 Personnel halting and stimulation response rifle (PHaSR) A non-lethal hand-held weapon developed by the United States Air Force  Its purpose is to "dazzle" or stun a target.  It was developed by U.S. Air Force's Directed Energy Directorate. Blinding weapon: banned.
 The Russian truck-mounted Almaz HEL
 Boeing Laser Avenger Mounted on an AN/TWQ-1 Avenger combat vehicle. Small anti-drone weapon. Experimental.
 Portable Efficient Laser Testbed (PELT) Anti-riot less-lethal weapon. Status unknown.
 Laser AirCraft CounterMeasures (ACCM)
 High Energy Liquid Laser Area Defense System (HELLADS) A counter-RAM aircraft or truck-mounted laser under development by General Atomics under a DARPA contract. 150 kilowatt goal. Uses a lasing medium immersed in an index matched coolant.
 Turkey's laser weapon ARMOL passed acceptance tests in 2019. Experimental.
 In 2014, the U.S. began field testing a 30 kW directed-energy weapon it calls the AN/SEQ-3 Laser Weapon System (LaWS) onboard  while deployed in the Persian Gulf. The tests went well and the system was declared operational. It was moved to  after Ponce was decommissioned. It has been proved to be effective against small, unprotected targets at very short distance.
In August 2017, India's Defence Research and Development Organisation was reportedly able to create a hole in a metal sheet kept at a distance of 250 meters in 36 seconds using a 1-kilowatt laser weapon.
 Dragonfire is a 50 kW scalable laser directed-energy weapon in development by the United Kingdom, it was first shown at DSEI September 2017. In 2022 it completed the first two of four planned service acceptance trials.
 The 60 kW High Energy Laser and Integrated Optical-dazzler and Surveillance (HELIOS) will be tested on an Arleigh Burke–class destroyer in 2021. Prototype.
 The Pulsed energy projectile (PEP) is a controversial, truck-mounted riot control laser-based less-lethal weapon to be used against civilians. A laser pulse ablates material causing a shockwave which stuns the targeted individual.
 In May 2020, the Technology Maturation Laser Weapon System Demonstrator (LWSD) installed on the USS Portland (LPD-27) successfully managed to destroy an unprotected, small, non-maneouvering unmanned aerial vehicle (UAV) at very short distance. Experimental.
 The Iron Beam anti-missile weapon produced by Israeli company Rafael Advanced Defense Systems was announced in 2014 and conducted trials in April 2022.
 In 2020 Israel deployed a laser system named Light Saber capable of popping balloons as part of its Iron Dome defence system.
 In July 2021, a laser weapon system developed by Hellenic company Soukos Robotics was unveiled at Defence Exhibition Athens (DEFEA).

Most of these projects have been canceled, discontinued, never went beyond the prototype or experimental stage, or are only used in niche applications like dazzling, blinding, mine clearance or close defense against small, unprotected targets. Effective, high performance laser weapons seem to be difficult to achieve using current or near-future technology.

Problems

Laser beams begin to cause plasma breakdown in the atmosphere at energy densities of around one megajoule per cubic centimeter. This effect, called "blooming," causes the laser to defocus and disperse energy into the surrounding air. Blooming can be more severe if there is fog, smoke, dust, rain, snow, smog, or foam in the air.

Techniques that may reduce these effects include:
 Spreading the beam across a large, curved mirror that focuses the power on the target, to keep energy density en route too low for blooming to happen. This requires a large, very precise, fragile mirror, mounted somewhat like a searchlight, requiring bulky machinery to slew the mirror to aim the laser.
 Using a phased array. For typical laser wavelengths, this method would require billions of micrometer-size antennae.  There is currently no known way to implement these, though carbon nanotubes have been proposed. Phased arrays could theoretically also perform phase-conjugate amplification (see below). Phased arrays do not require mirrors or lenses, and can be made flat and thus do not require a turret-like system (as in "spread beam") to be aimed, though range will suffer if the target is at extreme angles to the surface of the phased array.
 Using a phase-conjugate laser system. This method employs a "finder" or "guide" laser illuminating the target. Any mirror-like ("specular") points on the target reflect light that is sensed by the weapon's primary amplifier. The weapon then amplifies inverted waves, in a positive feedback loop, destroying the target, with shockwaves as the specular regions evaporate. This avoids blooming because the waves from the target pass through the blooming, and therefore show the most conductive optical path; this automatically corrects for the distortions caused by blooming. Experimental systems using this method usually use special chemicals to form a "phase-conjugate mirror". In most systems, however, the mirror overheats dramatically at weapon-useful power levels.
 Using a very short pulse that finishes before blooming interferes, but this requires a very high power laser to concentrate large amounts of energy in that pulse which doesn't exist in a weaponized or easily weaponizable form.
 Focusing multiple lasers of relatively low power on a single target. This is increasingly bulky as the total power of the system increases.

Countermeasures
Essentially, laser generates a beam of light which will be delayed or stopped by any opaque medium and perturbed by any translucent or less than perfectly transparent medium just like any other type of light. A simple, dense smoke screen can and will often block a laser beam. Infrared or multi-spectrum smoke grenades or generators will also disturb or block infrared laser beams. Any opaque case, cowling, bodywork, fuselage, hull, wall, shield or armor will absorb at least the "first impact" of a laser weapon, so the beam must be sustained to achieve penetration.

The Chinese People's Liberation Army has invested in the development of specialized coatings that can deflect beams fired by U.S. military lasers. Laser light can be deflected, reflected, or absorbed by manipulating physical and chemical properties of materials. Artificial coatings can counter certain specific types of lasers, but a different type of laser may match the coating's absorption spectrum enough to transfer damaging amounts of energy. The coatings are made of several different substances, including low-cost metals, rare earths, carbon fiber, silver, and diamonds that have been processed to fine sheens and tailored against specific laser weapons. China is developing anti-laser defenses because protection against them is considered far cheaper than creating competing laser weapons.

Dielectric mirrors, inexpensive ablative coatings, thermal transport delay, and obscurants are also being studied as countermeasures. In not a few operational situations, even simple, passive countermeasures like rapid rotation (which spreads the heat and does not allow a fixed targeting point except in strictly frontal engagements), higher acceleration (which increases the distance and changes the angle quickly), or agile maneuvering during the terminal attack phase (which hampers the ability to target a vulnerable point, forces a constant re-aiming or tracking with close to zero lag, and allows for some cooling) can defeat or help to defeat non-highly pulsed, high-energy laser weapons.

In popular culture

Arthur C. Clarke envisaged particle beam weapons in his 1955 novel Earthlight, in which energy would be delivered by high-velocity beams of matter. After the invention of the laser in 1960, it briefly became the death ray of choice for science fiction writers. By the late 1960s and 1970s, as the laser's limits as a weapon became evident, the ray gun began to be replaced by similar weapons with names that better reflected the destructive capabilities of the device (like the blasters in Star Wars or the phasers in Star Trek, which were originally lasers: according to The Making of Star Trek, Gene Roddenberry claimed that production staff realized that using laser technology would cause problems in the future as people came to understand what lasers could and could not do; this resulted in the move to phasers on-screen, while letting lasers be known as a more primitive weapon style.)

See also  
 Directed-energy weapon
 Ivan's hammer
 Laser sight
 Space weapon
 Weapons in science fiction

References

Laser applications
Directed-energy weapons